Timbo may refer to:

 Timbó, a municipality in Brazil
 Timbo, Arkansas, a town in the United States
 Timbo, Guinea, a town in Guinea
 Timbo blanco or Albizia inundata, a tropical tree with light wood
 Timbo King (born 1973)

See also
 The Timberland Company, footwear manufacturer
 Timbaland (born 1972), American rapper and record producer